Leslie Lars Iversen  (31 October 1937 – 30 July 2020), was a British pharmacologist, known for his work on the neurochemistry of neurotransmission.

Career and research
From 1971 to 1982, Iversen was Director of the MRC Neurochemical Pharmacology Unit in Cambridge. Between 1982 and 1995 he worked as Director of the Merck, Sharp & Dohme Neuroscience Research Centre. In 1995 he became Visiting Professor of Pharmacology at the University of Oxford.

In 2010 he was accused of plagiarism. Consequently one of his books now credits the original author of the plagiarized work.

Awards and honours
He was elected a Fellow of the Royal Society (FRS) in 1980 and gave the Society's Ferrier Lecture in 1983. He was appointed a Commander of the Order of the British Empire (CBE) in the 2013 New Year Honours, "for services to pharmacology".

He died on 30 July 2020, survived by his wife of over 60 years, Susan Iversen.

References 

1937 births
2020 deaths
20th-century British biologists
21st-century British biologists
Academics of the University of Cambridge
British pharmacologists
Fellows of the Royal Society
Foreign associates of the National Academy of Sciences
Fellows of the American Academy of Arts and Sciences
Medical scholars of the University of Oxford
Members of Academia Europaea
Commanders of the Order of the British Empire